Gustavo Martín Jorge (born Lomas de Zamora, 24 October 1971) is a former Argentine rugby union player and a current coach. He played as a wing.

He played for Club Pucará and Club Atletico San Isidro in the Nacional de Clubes in Argentina. He returned to Club Pucará where he finished his player career in 2007/08.

Jorge had 23 caps for Argentina, since his debut, at the 103-9 win over Brazil, at 8 October 1989, in Montevideo, for the South American Rugby Championship, when he was only 17 years old, making him the youngest ever player for the "Pumas". He scored 6 tries in that game. He scored 24 tries, 111 points on aggregate during his international career. He was called for the 1991 Rugby World Cup but he never played. His last game was at the 16-11 win over the United States, at 20 June 1994, in Buenos Aires, for the 1995 Rugby World Cup qualifyings. He was only 22 years old but did not play again for the "Pumas".

He has been a coach for the youth categories at Club Pucará since his retirement.

References

External links
¿Qué será del Cuta Jorge?, Rugby Fun, 25 June 2010 (Spanish)

1971 births
Living people
Argentine rugby union players
Argentina international rugby union players
Club Atlético San Isidro rugby union players
Rugby union wings
Argentina international rugby sevens players
People from Lomas de Zamora
Sportspeople from Buenos Aires Province